The Wisconsin Great Northern Railroad operates a historic train line centered in Trego, Wisconsin on 26 miles of track, between Spooner, Wisconsin and Springbrook, Wisconsin. It was founded on April 1, 1997. The line runs dinner trains, bed and breakfast trains, and scenic sight seeing tours.

Locomotives
 LS&M #41 - GE 50-Ton Diesel Locomotive (likely built in 1941)
 WGN #314 - Former Green Bay & Western Alco C424 Diesel Locomotive (privately owned)
 WGN #423 - Former Chicago & North Western EMD F7
 WGN #600 - Former B&OCTRR EMD SW1
 WGN #862 - Former Milwaukee Road EMD SW1
 WGN #891 - Former Milwaukee Road or Erie Railroad EMD SW1
 WGN #1280 - Former American Can/Marathon Southern EMD SW600
 WGN #1386 - Former TP EMD GP35M
 WGN #1387 - Former MP EMD GP35M
 WGN #1388 - Former TP EMD GP35M
 WGN #1950 - Former Great Northern EMD F7
 WGN #1951 - Former Great Northern EMD F7
 WGN #6006 - Former Algoma Central Railway SD40-2, used for freight
 WGN #8760 - Rebuilt 1949 Alco S2M
 CB&Q #9903 “Injun Joe” - Acquired along with the rest of the Mark Twain Zephyr consist in July 2020.

Passenger
 WGN #1 "Allen L. Vreeland" - Originally a Pullman 1914 business car built for the Santa Fe, now a sleeper on the Bed & Breakfast Train
 Former Duluth, Missabe & Iron Range Railway crane X-7 & Boom Car #W6331.
 WGN #8 Budd RDC-1 Diesel Rail Car - Originally an RDC for the New York Central Railroad, currently out of service
 WGN #9 "Namekagon Dreams" - Originally a double bedroom buffet car for the Atlantic Coast Line, now a sleeper on the Bed & Breakfast Train
 WGN #10 "Pine Cavern" - Originally a Budd-built sleeping car for the Santa Fe, under renovation as a future sleeper on the Bed & Breakfast Train
 WGN #12 "Sleepy Hollow" - Originally a sleeper/lounge car for the Union Pacific, currently out of service
 WGN #13 "Royal Palm" - Originally an 11-bedroom sleeping car for the CNO&TP, currently out of service
 WGN #14 Chapel Car - Originally a Long Island Railroad coach car, currently out of service
 WGN #15 "Cascade Falls" - Originally a Budd-built 50-seat coach for the CB&Q, used on the Dinner Train through March 2020/currently out of service
 WGN #24 Santa Car - Originally a railroad post office car for the Milwaukee Road, now used on the Santa Pizza Train
 WGN #26 "East Lexington" - Originally a 12-section and one drawing room car for Pullman, currently out of service
 WGN #27 - Originally a wide vision cupola caboose, currently out of service
 WGN #32 "Apostle Isle" - Originally an 80-seat coach for the Duluth and Northern Minnesota Railway, now a 64-seat diner, currently out of service
 WGN #34 "Presque Isle" - Originally an 80-seat coach that was formerly used on Duluth, Missabe & Iron Range Railway on Maintenance-of-way trains, now a 56-seat diner, currently out of service
 WGN #100 "Amnicon Falls" & "Manitou Falls" - Originally an articulated coach car on the Southern Pacific Railroad, currently contains 7 private dining rooms and is used on the Dinner Train
 WGN #112 "Richard F. Gilberg" - Originally a mail and express car for the Duluth & Iron Range Railway (D&IR), rebuilt by the WGNRR as a club car, currently out of regular service
 WGN #143 DM&IR Caboose - Originally Duluth Missabe & Iron Range Caboose #C-143, currently being resorted by the railroad and on display next to the Trego Depot
 WGN #200 Kitchen Car - Originally a Havelock CB&Q Baggage Car, converted to a kitchen car by the Columbia Star Dinner Train, currently out of service
 WGN #300 "Copper Falls" & "Morgan Falls" - Originally an articulated coach car on the Texas & New Orleans Railroad, currently contains 7 private dining rooms and is used on the Dinner Train
 WGN #316 "Madeline" -  St. Louis Car Company designed this as Southern Traction Car #315 in 1913, occasionally used for Sightseeing trains, currently out of service
 WGN #421 "Bear's Den" - Originally a 14-section Touralux sleeping car for the Milwaukee Road, was used by the WGNRR as a crew car, currently out of service
 WGN #432 - Originally a Milwaukee Road RPO-Express car for the Olympian Hiawatha in early 1947, currently out of service
 WGN #500 - "Effie Dean" - Tavern-Lounge in the Mark Twain Zephyr consist.
 WGN #506 "Becky Thatcher" - "Becky Thatcher" - Baggage Car in the Mark Twain Zephyr consist.
 WGN #551 "Huckleberry Finn" - Dining Car in the Mark Twain Zephyr consist.
 Ex-#551 - Former Roseville Crossing Car - Originally a coach car constructed in 1948 for the Milwaukee Road, acquired by the WGNRR in 2021 and currently out of service
 WGN #573 "Tom Sawyer" - Observation-Lounge Car in the Mark Twain Zephyr consist.
 WGN #1114 Power Car - Originally a baggage car for the Milwaukee Road, currently used as a power car for most passenger trains at the Wisconsin Great Northern Railroad
 WGN #1341 "Willow Falls" - Originally a dining car for the Canadian National, now a new kitchen/dining car that debuted in 2022 on the Bed & Breakfast and Dinner Train
 WGN #2000 Namekagon Coach - Car built as part of the Namekagon Train which ran between the Twin Cities and Ashland, currently out of service and parked in the Spooner, Wisconsin yards
 WGN #2004 - Originally a 24-section car built in 1954 for the Canadian National, currently out of service
 WGN #3003 "Aristocrat" - Originally a tavern lounge for the Louisville & Nashville Railroad, used on the Bed & Breakfast and Dinner Trains
 WGN #6226 - Originally a 52-seat coach built for the Seaboard Air Line, moved to the Wisconsin Great Northern in 2021, currently out of service
 WGN #10674 - Originally a Gulf, Mobile & Ohio Coach car, featured in the movie "In the Heat of the Night", currently out of service awaiting restoration
 WGN #39972 - Originally a Santa Fe Hi-Level Lounge and Amtrak Pacific Parlour Car, currently used on the railroad's Wine & Cheese Train
 Flat Car WGN #250578
 Flat Car WGN #985353
 Former Pearl Lake Engine & 2 Cabooses (acquired February 2021 and awaiting restoration)
 "Winette" / "Captain Hook" - Originally a Pullman business car built in 1930 built for W.R. Reynolds of the Reading Transit & Light Company, currently out of service awaiting restoration
 Former C&NW Baggage Car -  constructed in the 1920s or 1930s and used for many decades along the various lines of the C&NW in the central United States
 Former M&StL Doodlebug
 Former C&NW Snow Plow #935 (parked at the railroad's Spooner yard)

Midwest Rail Rangers Partnership (2019-2022) 
The Midwest Rail Rangers, a 501(c)(3) non-profit organization, had a partnership agreement with the Wisconsin Great Northern from July 2019 to July 2022. On select weekends, volunteers with the Midwest Rail Rangers presented on-board educational programs aboard the railroad's Sky Parlour Car. What is now called the Wisconsin Great Northern's Sky Parlour Car once served as a Hi-Level lounge car on the Atchison, Topeka and Santa Fe Railway (1956-1971), See-Level lounge car on Amtrak (1971-1995), and most recently as a Pacific Parlour Car on Amtrak's Coast Starlight train. The Rail Rangers presented a free program for passengers that included showing off various historical displays and artifacts about the historic railroad car.

References

External links
 

1997 establishments in Wisconsin
Heritage railroads in Wisconsin
Tourist attractions in Washburn County, Wisconsin